Chahinez Nasri (born 3 June 1996) is a Tunisian race walker. She competed in the women's 20 kilometres walk event at the 2016 Summer Olympics. In 2019, she competed in the women's 20 kilometres walk event at the 2019 World Athletics Championships held in Doha, Qatar. She did not finish her race.

References

External links
 

1996 births
Living people
Tunisian female racewalkers
Place of birth missing (living people)
Athletes (track and field) at the 2016 Summer Olympics
Olympic athletes of Tunisia
Athletes (track and field) at the 2019 African Games
African Games competitors for Tunisia
20th-century Tunisian women
21st-century Tunisian women